2,2′-Dipyridyldisulfide, sometimes known as DPS, is used for preparing thiols and activating carboxylic acid for coupling reactions, as in the following reaction:

Uses

It is also used in molecular biology as an oxidising agent, for example to oxidise free thiols to form disulfide bonds in proteins.

References

Organic disulfides
2-Pyridyl compounds
Reagents for organic chemistry